Fairview, Oregon is the name of one city and several unincorporated communities in the U.S. state of Oregon. They are:

Fairview, Oregon (city located in Multnomah County)
Fairview, Coos County, Oregon
Fairview, Tillamook County, Oregon